Rodney R. Hannula is a retired major general in the National Guard of the United States.

Biography
Hannula graduated from high school in Saxon, Wisconsin in 1958. Later he graduated from what is now the University of Wisconsin-La Crosse and the University of Minnesota.

Career
Hannula was first commissioned an officer in the Wisconsin Army National Guard in 1961 after having previously been an enlisted man. From 1998 to 2000 he was in command of the 34th Infantry Division. His retirement was effective as of September 30, 2000.

Awards he received include the Legion of Merit with two oak leaf clusters, the Meritorious Service Medal with two oak leaf clusters, the Army Commendation Medal, the National Defense Service Medal with service star, the Army Reserve Components Achievement Medal, the Armed Forces Reserve Medal with silver hourglass device, and the Army Service Ribbon.

References

People from Iron County, Wisconsin
Military personnel from Wisconsin
United States Army generals
Recipients of the Legion of Merit
University of Wisconsin–La Crosse alumni
University of Minnesota alumni
Living people
Year of birth missing (living people)